Central African Republic competed at the 2012 Summer Olympics in London, United Kingdom from 27 July to 12 August 2012. This was the nation's ninth appearance at the Olympics, excluding three games after its national debut in 1968.

Comité National Olympique et Sportif Centrafricain sent the nation's largest delegation in its Olympic history, after the 1992 Summer Olympics in Barcelona. 6 athletes, an equal share between men and women, were selected to the team, competing only in athletics, taekwondo, swimming, and wrestling (the last two sports marked its Olympic debut in London). Sprinter Berenger Aymard Bosse, who advanced past the first round for the first time in the men's event, became the only athlete to compete at his second Olympics. Taekwondo jin David Boui, on the other hand, was appointed by the committee to be the nation's flag bearer at the opening ceremony. Central African Republic, however, has yet to win its first Olympic medal.

Athletics

Key
 Note–Ranks given for track events are within the athlete's heat only
 Q = Qualified for the next round
 q = Qualified for the next round as a fastest loser or, in field events, by position without achieving the qualifying target
 NR = National record
 N/A = Round not applicable for the event
 Bye = Athlete not required to compete in round

Men

Women

Swimming

Men

Taekwondo

Central African Republic has qualified 2 athletes.

Wrestling

Central African Republic has received one wild card in wrestling.

Key:
  - Victory by Fall.
  - Decision by Points - the loser with technical points.
  - Decision by Points - the loser without technical points.

Women's freestyle

References

External links 
 
 

Nations at the 2012 Summer Olympics
2012
Olympics